Methyl phenyldiazoacetate is the organic compound with the formula C6H5C(N2)CO2Me. It is a diazo derivative of methyl phenylacetate.  Colloguially referred to as "phenyldiazoacetate", it is generated and used in situ after isolation as a yellow oil.

Methyl phenyldiazoacetate and many related derivatives are precursors to donor-acceptor carbenes, which can be used for cyclopropanation or to insert into C-H bonds of organic substrates.  These reactions are catalyzed by dirhodium tetraacetate or related chiral complexes.  Methyl phenyldiazoacetate is prepared by treating methyl phenylacetate with p-acetamidobenzenesulfonyl azide in the presence of base.

References

Diazo compounds
Reagents for organic chemistry